is a city located in Fukuoka Prefecture, Japan. As of February 1, 2016, the city has an estimated population of 67,915 and a population density of 1,287.24 persons per km². The total area is 52.76 km².

The modern city of Fukutsu was established on January 24, 2005, from the merger of the towns of Fukuma and Tsuyazaki (both from Munakata District).

place name 
 Fukuma area
 （It is the district since the town system from the former Shimosaigo village, and it has not been installed from the Fukuma town period to the present."Fukutsu city"is followed by the street number.）
 Akebono
 Azemachi
 Chuo 1chome∼6chome
 Fukumaekihigashi 1chome∼3chome
 Fukumaminami 1chome∼5chome
 Hanamigahama 1chome∼3chome
 Hanamigaoka 1chome∼3chome
 Hanaminosato 1chome∼3chome
 Higashifukuma 1chome∼8chome
 Himakino 1chome∼6chome
 Hisasue
 Kamisaigo
 Koyodai 1chome∼6chome
 Koyodaiminami
 Motogi
 Murayamada
 Nishifukuma 1chome∼4chome
 Odake
 Odake 1chome∼2chome
 Sakuragawa
 Sharikura
 Takahira
 Tebika
 Tebikaminami 1chome∼2chome
 Tsumaru
 Uchidono
 Wakagidai 1chome∼6chome
 Yatsunami
 Yuminosato 1chome∼2chome
 Tsuyazaki area
 Araji
 Hoshigaoka
 Katsura
 Miyaji 1chome∼6chome
 Miyajigaoka
 Miyajihama 1chome∼4chome
 Miyajimotomachi
 Nuyama
 Oishi
 Sudata
 Tsuyazaki
 Tsuyazaki 1chome∼8chome
 Watari
 Yukue

See also
Fukuma Station

References

External links

 Fukutsu City official website 

 
Cities in Fukuoka Prefecture